Washington County is a county located in the southwestern part of the U.S. state of Alabama. As of the 2020 census, the population was 15,388. The county seat is Chatom. The county was named in honor of George Washington, the first President of the United States. It is a dry county, with the exception of Chatom. In September 2018 The United States Office of Management and Budget (OMB) added Washington County to the Mobile, Alabama Metropolitan Statistical Area. It is also part of the larger Mobile-Daphne-Fairhope, AL Combined Statistical Area.

The MOWA Band of Choctaw Indians is the first state-recognized tribe in Alabama. It is based in Washington County, with some members also in Mobile County, Alabama. A total of nine tribes have received state recognition since 1979.

History

The area of today's Washington County was long inhabited by various indigenous people. In historic times, European traders encountered first Choctaw, whose territory extended through most of present-day Mississippi, and later Creek Indians, who had moved southwest from Georgia ahead of early European settlers who were encroaching on their land.

Washington County was organized on June 4, 1800, from the Tombigbee District of the Mississippi Territory by proclamation of territorial governor Winthrop Sargent. It was the first county organized in what would later become Alabama, as settlers moved westward after the American Revolutionary War. Washington County is the site of St. Stephens, the first territorial capital of Alabama. In 1807 former U.S. Vice President Aaron Burr was arrested at Wakefield in Washington County, during his flight from being prosecuted for alleged treason (which he was eventually found innocent of).

In the 1830s, the U.S. government removed most of the Choctaw and Creek to Indian Territory (now Oklahoma) west of the Mississippi River. Some members of these tribes stayed behind on their traditional lands in southwest Alabama, taking refuge in the forests and swamps. They were nominally considered state (and U.S.) citizens, but suffered severe racial discrimination.

In the 19th century, the county was largely developed for cotton plantations, with labor supplied by thousands of enslaved African Americans. Many had been transported by slave traders to the Deep South in a forced migration in the early part of the century, as the land was being developed.

During the American Civil War, more than three quarters of the adult white men in the county were serving in the Confederate Army by 1863. In that year, a group of children petitioned the Confederate government to avoid drafting more white men, so they might serve as a home guard militia. The petition claimed the militia was needed to guard against a potential slave uprising, since there were numerous cotton plantations with large numbers of enslaved African Americans. No such uprising occurred.

While the county continued to rely on agriculture into the 20th century, the infestation of the boll weevil destroyed many cotton crops. Mechanization and industrial-scale agriculture reduced the need for labor. Thousands of African Americans left the South in the Great Migration to Northern and Midwestern industrial cities, where they could get better jobs and escape the legal segregation and violence of the South. In the early 20th century industrialists began to harvest and process the pine and other timber in this area of the state.

The Choctaw and Creek Native Americans struggled to maintain their traditional culture, in the face of years during which the state government imposed a binary system of dividing people into white and "all other" people of color (blacks and Indians). Records no longer recognized their identifying as Choctaw, particularly in the period of Jim Crow after the Reconstruction era.

It was not until the 1930s that the Choctaw were able to get Indian schools to support their culture in Mobile and Washington counties, where their people have been concentrated. For a time they were called Cajun, but have no connection to such descendants of Acadians, based largely in Louisiana. The people pressed to gain recognition for their own ethnicity. In 1979 the Alabama legislature officially recognized the MOWA Band of Choctaw Indians. In 1984 it passed legislation to establish a commission to represent Native American interests in the state; through that, a total of nine tribes have received state recognition.

While the timber industry continued to be important to the economy, the county has gradually developed other businesses and industries, particularly petrochemical. Due to damage from Hurricane Frederic in 1979, the county was declared a disaster area that September.

Geography
This makes Washington County larger than the state of Rhode Island in terms of land area (but not total area). The county is located approximately 60 miles north of the Gulf of Mexico, and exceeds 682,000 acres of land. About 88 percent of the land area is covered by forest and pine plantations.

The Tombigbee River borders Washington County to the east. From the southern point of the river, the boundary runs diagonally south-west, bisecting the community of Calvert. From there, the southern boundary runs west, roughly following the 31°08' N parallel, toward the Mississippi state line, descending due south into Mobile County and forming part of a rectangle that connects with the state line. The western boundary is defined by the Alabama-Mississippi state line (approximately 88°27' W). The northern boundary runs west from the state line along the 31°41' N parallel until reaching the Tombigbee River.

Adjacent counties
Choctaw County (north)
Clarke County (east)
Baldwin County (southeast)
Mobile County (south)
Greene County, Mississippi (southwest)
Wayne County, Mississippi (northwest)

Transportation

Major highways
 U.S. Highway 43
 U.S. Highway 45
 State Route 17
 State Route 56

Railroad
The Norfolk Southern Railroad runs north out of the Port of Mobile and along the eastern corridor of Washington County, providing transport of raw materials to several chemical and electrical plants situated along the Tombigbee River.

Demographics

2020

As of the 2020 United States census, there were 15,388 people, 5,990 households, and 4,208 families residing in the county.

2010
According to the 2010 United States census, the racial makeup of the county is as follows:

65.5% White(non-Hispanic)
24.9% Black
8.0% Native American
0.1% Asian 
0.0% Native Hawaiian or Pacific Islander 
1.2% Two or more races
0.9% Hispanic or Latino (of any race)

2000
As of the census of 2000, there were 18,097 people, 6,705 households, and 5,042 families residing in the county.  The population density was 17 people per square mile (6/km2).  There were 8,123 housing units at an average density of 8 per square mile (3/km2).  The racial makeup of the county was 64.98% White(non-Hispanic), 26.89% Black or African American, 7.12% Native American, 0.06% Asian, 0.03% Pacific Islander, 0.05% from other races, and 0.87% from two or more races.  1.1% of the population were Hispanic or Latino of any race.

There were 6,705 households, out of which 37.90% had children under the age of 18 living with them, 59.10% were married couples living together, 12.50% had a female householder with no husband present, and 24.80% were non-families. 22.80% of all households were made up of individuals, and 10.10% had someone living alone who was 65 years of age or older.  The average household size was 2.69 and the average family size was 3.17.

In the county, the population was spread out, with 28.70% under the age of 18, 8.60% from 18 to 24, 27.40% from 25 to 44, 22.90% from 45 to 64, and 12.40% who were 65 years of age or older.  The median age was 35 years. For every 100 females there were 96.10 males.  For every 100 females age 18 and over, there were 91.10 males.

The median income for a household in the county was $30,815, and the median income for a family was $37,881. Males had a median income of $35,237 versus $18,337 for females. The per capita income for the county was $14,081.  About 14.80% of families and 18.50% of the population were below the poverty line, including 21.50% of those under age 18 and 22.70% of those age 65 or over.

Population decline
Like many rural Alabama counties, Washington County has had rural flight since 2000, as younger people have moved to cities for work opportunities. Factors contributing to this phenomenon include depressed economic opportunity within the county and the ongoing urbanization of the United States. Urbanization, especially urban areas adjacent to a rural area, draws young people out of rural areas, offering more and better public services as well as access to better-paying, white-collar jobs.

Education
The Washington County School system operates public schools in the county. Its high schools include:
Fruitdale High School
Leroy High School
McIntosh High School
Millry High School
Washington County High School

Politics
Like much of the Deep South, prior to the Civil Rights Movement of the 1960s, only white Washington County voters enjoyed the franchise, and they had long supported the Democratic Party in national, state and local elections. Most blacks had been disenfranchised since the turn of the century, as were many poor whites.

After Congress passed civil rights legislation under the leadership of President Lyndon Johnson, in addition to legislation to support his Great Society policies, the county's conservative white electorate began to support Republican candidates in presidential elections. With revival of their constitutional rights in voting, African Americans tended to align with the national Democratic Party.

Following the presidency of Ronald Reagan and the rise of the Moral Majority of the 1980s, conservative white Washington County voters have increasingly elected Republicans in national elections, and they have essentially realigned with that party. Bill Clinton, a nominee from Arkansas, was the last Democratic presidential nominee to win Washington County, doing so in his successful 1996 reelection campaign. By contrast, the minority of African American and Native American voters continue to support Democratic candidates.

While Democrats, until 2015, continued to represent the county in both houses of the state legislature, voters have not supported a Democratic candidate for governor since 2002. That year the state's last Democratic governor, Don Siegelman, lost reelection to Republican Bob Riley.

As of 2021, Brett Easterbrook (R-Fruitdale) has represented Washington County in the Alabama House of Representatives (District 65) since 2018. Greg Albritton (R-Excel) has represented Senate District 22, the bulk of the county (along with parts of seven other counties, stretching into south Baldwin County and as far north as Choctaw County, and from the Mississippi border on the west to as far east as the Escambia-Covington County border and Conecuh-Butler county border) in the Alabama Senate since 2015. An eastern sliver of the county along the Tombigbee falls in District 23, represented by Hank Sanders.

The county lies within Alabama's 1st congressional district, which has been represented by Republican Jerry Carl since January 2021.

Communities

Towns
Chatom (county seat)
McIntosh
Millry

Census-designated places

Calvert (partly in Mobile County)
Cullomburg (partly in Choctaw County)
Deer Park
Fairford
Fruitdale
Hobson
Leroy
Malcolm
St. Stephens
Sims Chapel
Tibbie
Vinegar Bend

Unincorporated communities
 Cortelyou
 Escatawpa
 Frankville
 Laton Hill
 Sunflower
 Wagarville
 Yellow Pine
 Yarbo

Ghost town
 Wakefield

Places of interest
Washington County has three sites listed on the National Register of Historic Places: 
 Andrews Chapel in McIntosh 
 Old Washington County Courthouse 
 Old St. Stephens Site in St. Stephens.
  
The Washington County Museum is located in the courthouse in Chatom.

Notable people
 Wilmer Mizell (1930–1999) was born in Vinegar Bend. He was a left-handed pitcher in major league baseball. After his sports career, he was elected to three terms as a Republican congressman. He represented North Carolina's 5th congressional district from 1969 to 1975, after white conservatives began electing Republican candidates.
 Beverly Jo Scott, singer-songwriter who lives and works in Belgium, was born in Deer Park in 1959.
 Shawna Thompson, a singer and part of the country music duo Thompson Square, is from Chatom.

See also
National Register of Historic Places listings in Washington County, Alabama
Properties on the Alabama Register of Landmarks and Heritage in Washington County, Alabama

References

External links
 Washington County map of roads/towns (map © 2007 Univ. of Alabama).
 South Alabama Community Website
 Washington County Sheriff's Office

 

 
1800 establishments in Mississippi Territory
Populated places established in 1800